Johann Georg Roederer (13 May 1726 – 4 April 1763) was a German physician and obstetrician who was a native of Strasbourg. He was father-in-law to historian August Ludwig von Schlözer (1735–1809).

Roederer studied medicine at Leiden, Paris and London, and afterwards was a pupil at the midwifery school in Strasbourg under Johann Jakob Fried (1689–1769). Through a recommendation from Albrecht von Haller (1708–1777), he was appointed in 1751 as the first professor of obstetrics at the University of Göttingen by George II, the British monarch and elector of Hanover.

Among his written works was a 1753 publication on the "elements of obstetrics" titled , and a treatise involving observations made with Carl Gottlieb Wagler (1731–1778) on the typhoid epidemic at Göttingen (1757–1763). He was a member of the Académie Royale de Chirurgie, and in 1757, was elected a foreign member of the Royal Swedish Academy of Sciences.

His name is associated with the obstetrical term: Roederer-Kopfhaltung (Roederer-head position). 

He died in Paris on 4 April 1763 at the age of 36. After his death, his position at Göttingen was filled by Heinrich August Wrisberg (1739–1808).

References 
 This article is based on a translation of an equivalent article at the German Wikipedia, whose references include: ADB:Roederer, Johann Georg @ Allgemeine Deutsche Biographie.

German obstetricians
Physicians from Strasbourg
Academic staff of the University of Göttingen
Members of the Royal Swedish Academy of Sciences
1726 births
1763 deaths